Oleg Bolkhovets (born April 20, 1976) is a Russian long-distance runner. He won the 2004 California International Marathon and competed in the marathon at the 2005 World Championships.

Achievements

References

External links
IAAF profile

1976 births
Living people
Russian male long-distance runners
Russian male marathon runners